The Espenlaub line of automobiles was a series of innovative and unusual vehicles created by Gottlob Espenlaub, a German inventor, between 1928 and 1953.  Although Espenlaub was mainly known for his work on gliders and rocket propulsion, he also worked as a pioneer of aerodynamics and lightweight construction.  The early experimental cars were unusual and unique.  Plans to launch a range of elegant, sporty coupés in the early 1950s fell through for economic reasons, and only a few pre-production vehicles were available for testing.

References

Car manufacturers of Germany
German brands
Vehicle manufacturing companies established in 1928
German companies established in 1928